Imantodes phantasma, the phantasma tree snake  s a species of snake in the family Colubridae.  The species is native to Panama and Colombia.

References

Imantodes
Snakes of Central America
Snakes of South America
Reptiles of Panama
Reptiles of Colombia
Reptiles described in 1982